In enzymology, a lysine—tRNA ligase is an enzyme that catalyzes the chemical reaction

ATP + L-lysine + tRNALys  AMP + diphosphate + L-lysyl-tRNALys

The 3 substrates of this enzyme are ATP, L-lysine, and tRNA(Lys), whereas its 3 products are AMP, diphosphate, and L-lysyl-tRNA(Lys).

This enzyme participates in 3 metabolic pathways: lysine biosynthesis, aminoacyl-trna biosynthesis, and amyotrophic lateral sclerosis (als).

Nomenclature 

This enzyme belongs to the family of ligases, to be specific, those forming carbon-oxygen bonds in aminoacyl-tRNA and related compounds.  The systematic name of this enzyme class is L-lysine:tRNALys ligase (AMP-forming). Other names in common use include lysyl-tRNA synthetase, lysyl-transfer ribonucleate synthetase, lysyl-transfer RNA synthetase, L-lysine-transfer RNA ligase, lysine-tRNA synthetase, and lysine translase.

References

Further reading 

 
 
 
 

EC 6.1.1
Enzymes of known structure